Vito Dellino (born 16 April 1982) is an Italian weightlifter.

He competed in Weightlifting at the 2008 Summer Olympics in the 56 kg division finishing fourteenth with 247 kg. This beat his previous personal best by 12 kg.

At the 2009 European Weightlifting Championships he won gold in the clean and jerk, and overall silver in the 56 kg category with a total of 247 kg.

He is 5 ft 3 inches tall and weighs 128 lb.

References

External links 
 
 
 
 Vito Dellino at NBC Olympics website

1982 births
Living people
Italian male weightlifters
Olympic weightlifters of Italy
Weightlifters at the 2008 Summer Olympics
Mediterranean Games silver medalists for Italy
Mediterranean Games medalists in weightlifting
Competitors at the 2009 Mediterranean Games
European Weightlifting Championships medalists
20th-century Italian people
21st-century Italian people